Shiv Narayan Tandon was an Indian National Congress politician. He was a member of the 1st Lok Sabha from Kanpur. He died on 26 December 1999. The flyover at Kanpur Cantonment is named in his honour.

References

India MPs 1952–1957
Lok Sabha members from Uttar Pradesh
Indian National Congress politicians
Year of birth missing
1999 deaths
Politicians from Kanpur
Indian National Congress politicians from Uttar Pradesh